Dark Blue Almost Black is a 2006 Spanish drama film written and directed by Daniel Sánchez Arévalo. It was Arévalo's first film. He developed the story from his 2004 short film, Física II.

Plot 
Jorge is a young man whose plans for the future are put on hold when his father has a stroke. For seven years, he diligently nurses his father and works as a janitor while studying part-time to get a business degree.

When Natalia, his childhood crush, returns from a stint studying abroad, Jorge begins to yearn for something better. He is desperate to find a new and better job, but finds that no one will hire him because he has experience only as a janitor.

Antonio, Jorge's older brother, soon to be released from jail, is an opportunist who has never gotten along with their father. In prison, at a theater workshop, Antonio meets Paula, a beautiful young woman in jail on drug charges. Paula has a problem because she flirted with another inmate's boyfriend. Violently harassed in jail, she wants to get pregnant in order to be moved out of harm's way into the jail's maternity ward. Antonio initially just wants to have sex with her, but soon he falls in love with Paula. He wants to help her to get pregnant, but he discovers that he is sterile.

Everything changes when Antonio gets out of prison. He plays on Jorge's good nature to get him to step in during conjugal visits and help impregnate his jailbird girlfriend, Paula. Jorge reluctantly agrees, even though it might get in the way of his long-term on-off relationship with Natalia. Meanwhile, Jorge's best friend Israel secretly photographs men visiting an erotic masseur. He finds out that his father is one of the clients and thinks that he is gay. Irritated with his father's hypocrisy, Israel initially starts anonymously blackmailing him. However, he later begins to question his own sexuality when he dares to visit the erotic masseur, following in his father's footsteps.

Jorge's relationship with Natalia becomes difficult after she tries to get him a job where she works but he is only offered a position as a janitor. Then Antonio finds out that their father has an undisclosed bank account full of money.

Jorge makes regular "face-to-face" visits to the women's prison to carry out his brother's wishes and, inevitably, begins to fall for Paula. Gradually, they develop an unusual relationship. She gets pregnant and through her, Jorge learns to stop feeling responsible for everything and finally confront his own wishes, ignoring what the world expects of him. He breaks his relationship with Natalia and decides to wait for Paula's release. The relationship of the two brothers survives Jorge's emotional involvement. Antonio fails to retrieve the money his father had in a secret bank account.

Israel confronts both of his parents and his own sexual identity, finally achieving some degree of peace. Jorge and Paula have a baby daughter. He moves from the building where he has worked and lived for so many years, finding a new job as a janitor. When Jorge thinks of escaping his dead-end life, he dreams of a suit, which is dark blue, almost black. At the end, he takes Israel's car, breaks the store window and grabs the dark blue suit.

Cast

Awards
 3 Goya Awards: Best New Director, Best Supporting Actor (De la Torre), Best New Actor (Quim Gutiérrez)
 Venice Film Festival: Label Europa Cinemas Award, UAAR Award
 Tallinn Black Nights Film Festival: EurAsia Grand Prix
 Brian Award at the 63rd Venice International Film Festival.

DVD release
The film was released on DVD January 8, 2008 in the United States.

References

External links 
 

2006 films
Spanish LGBT-related films
Bisexuality-related films
2006 drama films
Madrid in fiction
2000s Spanish-language films
Spain in fiction
Films featuring a Best Supporting Actor Goya Award-winning performance
Films shot in Madrid
Films directed by Daniel Sánchez Arévalo
2006 LGBT-related films
2000s Spanish films